Norman Roy Williams (born 4 January 1931) is a former English cricketer.  Williams was a right-handed batsman who bowled fast-medium.  He was born at March, Cambridgeshire.

In 1949, Williams made his Minor Counties Championship debut for Cambridgeshire against Lincolnshire.  From 1949 to 1951, he represented the county in 3 Minor Counties matches.   Williams joined Cumberland in 1964, where he represented the county in 6 Minor Counties matches.  His final appearance for Cumberland came against the Lancashire Second XI.  He also played Minor Counties cricket for the Nottinghamshire Second XI.

Williams also played a first-class match for the Combined Services against Nottinghamshire in 1961.  In his only first-class match, he scored took 5 wickets at a bowling average of 20.20, with best figures of 4/67.

References

External links
Roy Williams at Cricinfo
Roy Williams at CricketArchive

1931 births
Living people
People from March, Cambridgeshire
English cricketers
Cambridgeshire cricketers
Combined Services cricketers
Cumberland cricketers